Hanker & Cairns was an architectural firm of Memphis, Tennessee.  It was formed in 1903 as a partnership of William Julius Hanker and Baynard S. Cairns.

The firm has a number of works that are listed on the U.S. National Register of Historic Places.

Works include (with attribution to a partner or to the firm):
Shrine Building (1923), 66 Monroe Ave., Memphis, Tennessee (Hanker & Cairns), NRHP-listed
the "new" Peabody Hotel (1925), Memphis
Sears and Roebuck tower (1927), Memphis
Bank of Commerce and Trust Company Building (1929), 45 S. 2nd St., Memphis, Tennessee (Hanker & Cairns), NRHP-listed
Cleveland Founders Historic District, roughly bounded by Victoria Ave., Sunflower Rd., Bolivar Ave., S Bayou Ave., & Avery St., Cleveland, Mississippi (Hanker & Cairns), NRHP-listed
Crisscross Lodge, 10056 Poplar Ave., Collierville, Tennessee (Hanker & Cairns), NRHP-listed
B. Lowenstein & Brothers Building, 27 S. Main St., Memphis, Tennessee (Hanker and Cairns), NRHP-listed
Memphis Trust Building, 12 S. Main St., Memphis, Tennessee (Hanker & Cairns), NRHP-listed
National Bank of Commerce Building, 200 S. Pruett St., Paragould, Arkansas (Hankers and Cairns), NRHP-listed
Joseph Newburger House, built 1912, 168 E. Parkway, South, Memphis, Tennessee (Hanker & Cairns), NRHP-listed
Scimitar Building, 179 Madison Ave., Memphis, Tennessee (Hanker, William J.), NRHP-listed
Scottish Rite Temple (Hanker and Cairns), Memphis
Cutrer Mansion, 109 Clark Street, Clarksdale, Mississippi (Hanker & Cairns)

References

Architecture firms based in Tennessee
Companies based in Memphis, Tennessee